Janina Hiller (born March 18, 1988) is a German female acrobatic gymnast. With partners Daniela Mehlhaff and Selina Frey-Sander, Hiller competed in the 2014 Acrobatic Gymnastics World Championships.

References

1988 births
Living people
German acrobatic gymnasts
Female acrobatic gymnasts